Eulamprotes wilkella is a moth of the family Gelechiidae. It is found in most of Europe. Outside of Europe, it is found in Turkey, the Caucasus and Siberia. 

The wingspan is 8–10 mm. Adults are usually dark brown with a creamy-yellow head and three silver bands across the forewing, although adults of form tarquiniella only have a single silver fascia. Adults are on wing in June and again in August in two generations per year.

The larvae feed on Cerastium fontanum. They live within the roots and lower stems of their host plant in a silken tube or tent. The species overwinters in a cocoon.

References

Moths described in 1758
Taxa named by Carl Linnaeus
Eulamprotes
Moths of Japan
Moths of Europe
Insects of Turkey